Gol Dasteh (also known as Shahrak-e Goldasteh) is a village in Firuzbahram Rural District, Chahardangeh District of Eslamshahr County, Tehran province, Iran. At the 2006 National Census, its population was 8,537 in 2,175 households. The following census in 2011 counted 9,904 people in 2,727 households. The latest census in 2016 showed a population of 7,602 people in 2,594 households; it was the largest village in its rural district.

References 

Eslamshahr County

Populated places in Tehran Province

Populated places in Eslamshahr County